The All England Jumping Course at Hickstead, known widely as Hickstead, is an equestrian centre in West Sussex, England, principally known for its showjumping. It hosts two international  competitions, the Al Shira'aa British Jumping Derby Meeting and the Longines Royal International Horse Show. The course was the first permanent showground for equestrian sport in the country, opening in 1960. The first Hickstead Derby was held in 1961.

Hickstead is best known as the home of British showjumping, though its major fixtures also feature other disciplines such as showing, carriage driving, scurry driving, side-saddle and arena eventing.

Over the years, the venue has expanded its operations to include other equestrian sports like dressage and arena polo, as well as hosting functions and conferences all year round.

It is located adjacent to the hamlet of Twineham, to the west of Burgess Hill and next to the main A23 road from London to Brighton.

History

The All England Jumping Course was opened by Douglas Bunn, a multi-millionaire former barrister who made his money running a caravan business.

Bunn purchased a site known as Hickstead Place with the intention of creating a facility to match those in the United States and Europe. The venue opened in 1960.

It now has six arenas, permanent seating for over 5,000 spectators and 26 corporate hospitality suites. It has hosted the 1965 Ladies World Championships, the 1974 World Championships and several European Show Jumping Championships.

British Jumping Derby

This four-day event attracts around 40,000 spectators a year, who come to watch the skill, bravery and precision of the national and international show jumpers competing for trophies (and substantial prize money).

A highlight of the meeting is the British Jumping Derby, known as the Al Shira'aa Derby, which is a 1,195-metre course with tricky jumps, including the aptly named Devil's Dyke – three fences in short succession with a water-filled ditch in the middle and the difficult Derby Bank, a jump with  rails on top and a  slope down the front.

The British Jumping Derby is one of those events a bit like the
Grand National where its not just the runners and riders that make the
headlines but the course itself. It's an iconic showjumping contest, the
like of which you won't find anywhere else in the world, no other
course asks this much of a test of horse and rider and no other course
creates this type of drama.

—Clare Balding, BBC Sport

Longines Royal International Horse Show

The Royal International Horse Show is the official horse show of the British Horse Society and consists of both showing and showjumping events.  The event is held during July each year. It is one of only three CHIO 5* events in the world, and home to the Longines FEI Nations Cup of Great Britain and the Longines King George V Gold Cup, also known as the British Grand Prix.

Other events
In 1993 the showground saw the establishment of a dressage arena and dressage programme known as Dressage at Hickstead. In 1998 it hosted Junior and Young Rider European Dressage Championships; and in 2003 it hosted the FEI European Dressage Championships. In 2020, Dressage at Hickstead was officially closed, but in May 2021 the main All England Jumping Course held its first British Dressage Premier League show, known as the ICE Horseboxes All England Dressage Festival.

In 2006 the All England Polo Club opened. Arena (winter) Polo is played on a 100m x 50m purpose built all weather arena. It is one of the premier Arena Polo venues in the country, and has hosted the international test match on a number of occasions.

Hickstead is also hired out to other show organisers throughout the year, including NSEA competitions, local branches of The Pony Club and British Riding Clubs, and other unaffiliated competitions. Each September, the Sunshine Tour unaffiliated championships take place there.

In 2019, Hickstead opened a huge all-weather cross-country course, which is available for hire from October to May.

References

External links
Hickstead site

Sports venues in West Sussex
Equestrian sports in the United Kingdom
Show jumping venues
Dressage venues
Equestrian sports in England